Mount Kostka is a mountain rising to  on the west side of Zykov Glacier,  southeast of Saddle Peak, in the Anare Mountains of Antarctica. It was photographed from the air by U.S. Navy Operation Highjump, 1946–47. It was surveyed by the Soviet Antarctic Expedition in 1958 and named after Czechoslovakian aerologist O. Kostka, a member of a later Soviet expedition, 1959–61, who perished in a fire at Mirnyy Station on August 3, 1960.

References

Mountains of Victoria Land
Pennell Coast